Thomas Bennet (aka Thomas Benet) was a British academic and administrator  University of Oxford.

He was an undergraduate, Fellow, and Master of University College, Oxford.

Bennet was a relative of Sir Simon Bennet, also an undergraduate of University College, whose settlement to the College in 1662 funded the Bennet Fellowship. Thomas Bennet himself held this Fellowship for a while. This was seen as a barrier to becoming Master of the College by the other fellows, but after a dispensation he was elected on 3 March 1691.

References 

17th-century English people
17th-century English educators
Alumni of University College, Oxford
Fellows of University College, Oxford
Masters of University College, Oxford
Year of birth missing
Year of death missing